Elysius pyrosticta is a moth of the family Erebidae. It was described by George Hampson in 1905. It is found in Brazil.

References

pyrosticta
Moths described in 1905
Moths of South America